Ittiva  is a village in Kollam district in the state of Kerala, India.

Demographics
 India census, Ittiva had a population of 16635 with 7832 males and 8803 females.

References

Villages in Kollam district